Sándor Szabó, anglicized as Sandor Szabo, may refer to:

 Sándor Szabó (wrestler) (1906–1966), Hungarian-born American wrestler
 Sándor Szabó (actor) (1915–1997), Hungarian actor
 Sándor Szabó (fencer) (1941–1992), Hungarian Olympic fencer
 Sándor Szabó (pentathlete), Hungarian pentathlete
 Sándor Szabó (musician) (born 1960), Hungarian concert pianist and music director
 Sándor Szabó (swimmer) (1951–2021), Hungarian Olympic swimmer
 Sándor Andó-Szabó, Hungarian football referee